Terēzija Broka, also known as Terēze Broka, (September 30, 1925 in Viļāni parish, Latvia – October 22, 2018) was a Latvian conductor, educator and culture worker. Broka was awarded the Order of the Three Stars in 1995 for promotion of Latgalian culture. Broka was chief conductor in three successive Latvian Song and Dance Festivals.

References

1925 births
2018 deaths
People from Rēzekne
Women conductors (music)
Choral conductors
Latvian conductors (music)
Music educators
Women music educators